Phulpingkot is a village in Sindhupalchok District in the Bagmati Zone of central Nepal. At the time of the 1991 Nepal census it had a population of 3714 and had 773 houses in the village. It has been divided into 9 wards. This VDC is attached to a famous the biggest monastery in Sindhupalchok (Dhuskot) called Karma Drubgyuling Gumba.People in this district have different ethnicity and religions. The neighboring VDCs are Jalbire, Hagam, Phulpingdada, Maneshwara and Bataase. People are involved in agriculture for living. Almost all of the people are in below poverty line. Many have been working in foreign soil for the survival of their family. Famous poet of Sindhupalchok District, Chandra Prasad Neupane is from this VDC.

References

Populated places in Sindhupalchowk District